Mulsantina is a genus of ladybugs (family Coccinellidae), found in North and Central America and in the Caribbean (Haiti).

The genus was named by entomologist Julius Weise after Étienne Mulsant, who in 1846 and 1850 published monographs that were very important to the development of modern coccinellid taxonomy. Mulsant had previously named this genus Cleis, but as this name was found to be already in use, Weise renamed it in Mulsant's honor.

Species
There are about nine species:

Mulsantina curva J. Chapin, 1985
Mulsantina cyathigera Gorham, 1891
Mulsantina hudsonica Casey, 1899
Mulsantina labyrinthica Sicard, 1929
Mulsantina luteodorsa J. Chapin, 1973
Mulsantina lynx Mulsant, 1850
Mulsantina mexicana J. Chapin, 1985
Mulsantina picta Randall, 1838
Mulsantina quinquelineata Mulsant, 1850

References

Coccinellidae genera
Taxa named by Julius Weise